PC Jeweller Limited (BSE: 534809) is a jeweller based in New Delhi, India. It started operations in April 2005 with one showroom at Karol Bagh Delhi and 80 showrooms in India. It is a first generation business promoted by two brothers- Padam Chand Gupta and Balram Garg. It presently has 80 stores in 66 cities across 17 States/UT.

PC Jeweller engages in the manufacture, export, wholesale and retail of gold and diamond jewelry in India. The company's business model consists of opening large format, standalone stores at high street locations. The company sells only hall marked jewellery and certified diamond jewellery.

Milestones

2005: P Chand Jewellers was incorporated. Showroom in Karol bagh inaugurated.      
2007: Two more showrooms opened, at Noida and Panchukla (Haryana) respectively. Company also commences export operations from the manufacturing unit at the Noida SEZ.
2008: Opens two more showrooms at Faridabad and Dehradun.
2009: Commences operations at the manufacturing unit in Selaqui and Dehradun. Two more showrooms opened in Pitampura (New Delhi) and Chandigarh.    
2011: Company goes public limited from private. Export operations unit begin from the Noida SEZ. Eight more showrooms open in Ludhiana, Bilaspur, Pali, South Extension (New Delhi), Beawar, Ajmer and Amritsar. 
2012: Six more showrooms opened in Kanpur, Rohtak, Indirapuram (Ghaziabad), Rajouri Garden (New Delhi), Kingsway Camp (New Delhi) and Greater Kailash – 1 (New Delhi)

Awards

2006: Awarded the Best Showroom award for Diamond Season by the B2C consultants, and brand architects
2008: Awarded Jeweller of the year in the Business Sphere Awards by the Business Sphere Group, Academicians Bureau Publications Private Limited.
2010: Awarded Highest Exporter and the Best Exporter in the gems and jewellery sector by the Noida SEZ, Department of commerce, Ministry of commerce and industry, Government of India for the year 2009-2010
2011: Awarded Highest Exporter (SEZ Unit) and the Best Exporter (Gems and Jewellery) sector by the Noida SEZ, Department of Commerce, Ministry of Commerce and Industry, Government of India for the year 2010–2011.
2012: Awarded Niryat Shree Silver Trophy in the gems and jewellery non-MSME category, by the federation of Indian Export Organisations, set up by the Ministry of Commerce and Industry, Government of India for the year 2009–2010.
2013: Awarded the Large - Plain Precious Metal Jewellery’ Award at Indian Gems and Jewellery Awards

Stores
PC Jeweller has 80 stores in 66 cities.
The company procures a large portion of its gold under the Reserve Bank of India's Metal (Gold) Loan policy. PC Jeweller had its initial public offering in December 2012. As of 2012 the company planned to open 20 stores each year and start opening franchise stores as well.

References

External links
 PC Jeweller Official Website

Companies based in New Delhi
Jewellery retailers of India
Indian jewellers
Indian brands